The 2021 Atlantic 10 women's basketball tournament was a postseason tournament that concluded the 2020-21 season of the Atlantic 10 Conference. It will be played at Siegel Center in Richmond, Virginia, March 10–14, 2021. VCU won the tournament, its first-ever title.

Seeds
Teams were seeded by record within the conference, with a tiebreaker system to seed teams with identical conference records.

Schedule

*Game times in Eastern Time.

Bracket
 All times are Eastern.

* denotes overtime period

References

See also
 2021 Atlantic 10 men's basketball tournament

2020–21 Atlantic 10 Conference women's basketball season
Atlantic 10 women's basketball tournament
Atlantic 10 women's basketball tournament
Basketball competitions in Richmond, Virginia
College basketball tournaments in Virginia
Women's sports in Virginia